The sport of football in the country of Samoa is run by the Football Federation Samoa.  The association administers the national football team, as well as the Samoa National League.

References

Football in Samoa